Joachim Wasserschlebe (1 May 1709, Salzwedel, Margraviate of Brandenburg - 13 March 1787, Wassersleben estates) was a German-Danish diplomat, politician, councillor, patron of the arts and art collector.

External links
Joachim Wasserschlebe in the Dansk biografisk Lexikon

1709 births
1787 deaths